A. arborea may refer to:
 Amelanchier arborea, the downy serviceberry or common serviceberry, a plant species native to eastern North America from the Gulf Coast north to Thunder Bay in Ontario and Lake St. John in Quebec and west to Texas and Minnesota
 Ampelopsis arborea, the pepper vine, a plant species native to the Southeastern United States, Texas and New Mexico

See also 
 Arborea (disambiguation)